Guillermo Stradella (born 4 January 1991, in Argentina) is an Argentine professional footballer who plays as a midfielder for Primera División club FAS.

Career
Stradella started his senior career with Atlético de Rafaela. In 2014, he signed for Portuguesa in the Venezuelan Primera División, where he made twenty-eight league appearances and scored zero goals. After that, he played for Club Sportivo Ben Hur and C.D. FAS, where he now plays.

Honours

Club
FAS
Salvadoran Primera División: Clausura 2021

References

External links 
 A Cordovan scorer in El Salvador
 Nationalization? The Argentine Stradella talks about this possibility 
 Guillermo Stradella and his experience in El Salvador 
 Stradella: "I want to play the classic and feel the climate of Salvadoran soccer"
 Guillermo Stradella: "You owe it to football, FAS and the family"

Living people
1991 births
Argentine footballers
Argentine expatriate footballers
Expatriate footballers in Venezuela
Expatriate footballers in El Salvador
Portuguesa F.C. players
C.D. FAS footballers
Club Sportivo Ben Hur players
Atlético de Rafaela footballers
Association football midfielders